Detlef Lohse (born 15 September 1963 in Hamburg) is a German physicist and professor in the University of Twente's Department of Physics of Fluids in the Netherlands.

Biography
Lohse studied at the University of Kiel and University of Bonn, graduating in Bonn in 1989 with a degree in Physics, and completed his PhD at the University of Marburg in 1992. He served as a postdoctoral research fellow at the University of Chicago with Leo Kadanoff from 1993 to 1995, and was finally made chair of Physics of Fluids at the University of Twente in 1998. Lohse has been an external member of the Max Planck Institute for Dynamics and Self-Organization in Göttingen, Germany. Since 2016, he is a founding member of the Max Planck Center for Complex Fluid Dynamics at University of Twente.

Scientific Work and Recognition
His present work includes turbulence and two-phase flows, granular flow, micro- and nanofluidics, and the biomedical application of bubbles.

Professor Lohse was a recipient of the 2019 Max Planck Medal, 2018 Balzan Prize, 2017 Fluid Dynamics Prize, 2012 Batchelor Prize, 2005 Spinoza Prize for his work on turbulence, thermal convection, multiphase flow, microfluidics, sonoluminescence, and was awarded with a knighthood in the Order of the Netherlands Lion in 2010.  He is also a member of the Royal Netherlands Academy of Arts and Sciences since 2005, a member of the National Academy of Engineering since 2017, and a Fellow of the American Physical Society.

References 

1963 births
Living people
21st-century German physicists
Knights of the Order of the Netherlands Lion
Members of the Royal Netherlands Academy of Arts and Sciences
Spinoza Prize winners
University of Bonn alumni
University of Marburg alumni
Academic staff of the University of Twente
Scientists from Hamburg
Fellows of the American Physical Society
Winners of the Max Planck Medal
Max Planck Society people